Josimar Higino Pereira (born 19 September 1961), more commonly known as Josimar, is a Brazilian former footballer. Throughout his career, he played as a right-back, mainly with Botafogo de Futebol e Regatas and the Brazil national team. In his prime, he was named the best right-back in the world by FIFA. He is currently assistant coach at Botafogo.

Career
Josimar was born in Rio de Janeiro.

Josimar won 16 caps with the Brazil national team, from June 1986 to November 1989. He played three times during the 1986 Football World Cup after an injury to first choice right back Édson. His two goals for Brazil were memorable, and were scored in his first two international matches, in that tournament.

Josimar's son, Josimar Jr., played for Botafogo youth teams. In the end of 2006, he moved to Cruzeiro and then later to Vasco in mid February 2008 by signing a 3-year deal until the end of 2010.

Honours

Club
Campeonato Carioca (Rio de Janeiro championship) in 1989 with Botafogo
Campeonato Cearense (Ceará State championship) in 1992 with Ceará Sporting Club

International
Copa América in 1989 with the Brazil national team
Rous Cup in 1987 with the Brazil national team

Individual
FIFA World Cup All-Star Team: 1986
South American Team of the Year: 1986, 1987

References

1961 births
Living people
Footballers from Rio de Janeiro (city)
Brazilian footballers
Brazilian expatriate footballers
Brazil international footballers
Brazil under-20 international footballers
Sport Club Internacional players
Campeonato Brasileiro Série A players
Botafogo de Futebol e Regatas players
CR Flamengo footballers
Bangu Atlético Clube players
Uberlândia Esporte Clube players
C.D. Jorge Wilstermann players
A.C.C.D. Mineros de Guayana players
Fortaleza Esporte Clube players
Sevilla FC players
La Liga players
1986 FIFA World Cup players
1987 Copa América players
1989 Copa América players
Expatriate footballers in Bolivia
Expatriate footballers in Venezuela
Expatriate footballers in Spain
Brazilian expatriate sportspeople in Bolivia
Brazilian expatriate sportspeople in Venezuela
Brazilian expatriate sportspeople in Spain
Copa América-winning players
Association football defenders